Hayseed, a derogatory term for a yokel, an unsophisticated individual from the countryside
Hayseed (album), a 2013 contemporary folk music album by Susan Werner
The Hayseed, a 1919 film by Fatty Arbuckle
Hayseed (film), a 1997 Canadian comedy film